The Rhön Mountains are a group of low mountains (or Mittelgebirge) in central Germany, located around the border area where the states of Hesse, Bavaria and Thuringia come together. These mountains, which are at the extreme southeast end of the East Hesse Highlands (Osthessisches Bergland), are partly a result of ancient volcanic activity. They are separated from the Vogelsberg Mountains by the river Fulda and its valley. The highest mountain in the Rhön is the Wasserkuppe, which is in Hesse. The Rhön Mountains are a popular tourist destination and walking area.

Origins

The name Rhön is often thought to derive from the Celtic word raino (=hilly), but numerous other interpretations are also possible. Records of the monks at Fulda Abbey from the Middle Ages describe the area around Fulda as well as more distant parts of the Rhön as Buchonia, the land of ancient beech woods. In the Middle Ages beech was an important raw material. Large scale wood clearing resulted in the "land of open spaces" (Land der offenen Fernen), 30% of which, today, is forested.

Geography

Location
Lying within the states of Hesse, Bavaria and Thuringia, the Rhön is bounded by the Knüll to the northwest, the Thuringian Forest to the northeast, the Grabfeld to the southeast, Lower Franconia to the south, the Spessart forest to the southwest and the Vogelsberg mountains to the west.

Division by type of volcanic activity 
Based on the effects of ancient volcanic activity, the Rhön can be divided into the "Anterior Rhön" (Vorderrhön), the "Kuppen Rhön" (geographical region 353, Kuppenrhön) and the "High Rhön" (354, Hohe Rhön).

The terms "Anterior Rhön" (Vorderrhön) and "Kuppen Rhön" (Kuppenrhön or Kuppige Rhön) are somewhat misleading, since the "Anterior Rhön" also consists mainly of Kuppen or low mountains with dome-shaped summits. The name has genuine historic origins: the "Anterior Rhön", as viewed from Thuringia, forms the foothills (or anterior part) of the mountain region.

In this gently rolling landscape numerous individual dome-shaped mountains rise on both sides of the border of Hesse and Thuringia and also, in some places, in Bavaria. These Kuppen are the remnants of ancient volcanos or volcanic activity.

Natural regions

Natural region divisions 
The Rhön and its immediate declivities are divided by the Handbook of the Natural Region Divisions of Germany into the following natural regions:

 (to 35 East Hesse Highlands (Osthessisches Bergland)
 353 Anterior and Kuppen Rhön (Vorder- und Kuppenrhön) (with the Landrücken)
 353.0 Hessian Landrücken (Hessischer Landrücken)
 353.1 Western Rhön Foreland (Westliches Rhönvorland)
 353.2 Western and Eastern Kuppen Rhön (Westliche und Östliche Kuppenrhön)
 353.20 Brückenau Kuppenrhön (Brückenauer Kuppenrhön, to )
 353.21 Milseburg Kuppenrhön (Milseburger Kuppenrhön, to )
 353.22 Soisberg Kuppenrhön (Soisberger Kuppenrhön, to )
 353.23 Middle Ulster Valley (Mittleres Ulstertal)
 353.24 Auersberg Kuppenrhön (Auersberger Kuppenrhön to )
 353.25 (?) Middle Felda Valley (Mittleres Feldatal)
 353.26 (?) Anterior Rhön (Vordere Rhön, to )
 353.3 Eastern Rhön Foreland (Östliches Rhönvorland)
 354 High Rhön (Hohe Rhön)
 354.0 Southern High Rhön (Südliche Hochrhön)(Umweltatlas Hessen: Südliche Hohe Rhön)
 354.00 Dammersfeld Ridge (Dammersfeldrücken, to )
 354.01 Black Mountains (Schwarze Berge, to )
 354.02 Kreuzberg Group (to )
 354.1 Central Rhön (Umweltatlas Hessen: Hochrhön)
 354.10 Wasserkuppenrhön (to )
 354.11 Long Rhön (to )
 354.12 Eastern slope of the Long Rhön (to )
 354.13 Upper Ulster Valley
 (to 355 Fulda-Haune Tableland)
 355.3 Haune Plateau
 355.30 Rombach Plateau
 355.31 Haune Valley (and Hünfeld Basin)
 355.32 Buchenau Plateau
 (zu 357 Fulda-Werra Uplands)
 357.20 Seulingswald
 (to 358 Salzungen Werra Upland)
 359.0 Stadtlengsfeld Hills (Stadtlengsfelder Hügelland)
 (to 13 Main-Franconian Plateaux (Mainfränkische Platten)
 (to 1381 Grabfeld)
 1381.0 Western Grabfeld
 (to 1382 Werra Gäu Plateaux (Werra-Gäuplatten or Meininger Kalkplatten)
 1382.0
 1382.00 Mellrichstadt Gäu (Mellrichstädter Gäu)
 1382.01 Bibra Saddle
 1382.? Dreißigacker-Sülzfeld Rhön Foothills (Dreißigacker-Sülzfelder Rhönabdachung)
 (to 14 Odenwald, Spessart and South Rhön)
 141 South Rhön (Südrhön)

High Rhön 

Its core area in the northeast used to be called the Plattenrhön. The High Rhön is a natural regional major unit in the East Hesse Highlands; see Natural regions.

The High Rhön has five main mountainous regions:

 Wasserkuppen Rhön
 Long Rhön (Lange Rhön)
 Dammersfeld Ridge (Dammerfeldrücken)
 Kreuzberg Group
 Black Mountains (Schwarze Berge)

At the heart of the Rhön, albeit only the fourth highest summit of these mountains, is the Heidelstein on the border between Bavaria and Hesse on the Rhine-Weser watershed. It forms the main high point on the plateau of the Long Rhön, which runs northeast over the Stirnberg as far as the Ellenbogen (Schnitzersberg) without crossing any significant lower ground. Within the Long Rhön the basalt layer is almost unbroken.

At the Heidelstein, another natural region, the Wasserkuppen Rhön, branches off in a north to northwesterly direction to the Rhön's highest summit, the Wasserkuppe, whose basalt likewise covers a wide area, but is broken in places by bunter sandstone and muschelkalk – in particular the basalt kuppen of the Weiherberg (northwest) and Ehrenberg ( northeast) are slightly separated from the rest.

The Long Rhön runs southwest along the main watershed to the Dammersfeld ridge which continues along the watershed via the Hohe Hölle and Eierhauckberg to the Dammersfeldkuppe, the ridge being clearly narrower than the Long Rhön and its basalt layer being interrupted several times. The Großer and Kleiner Auersberg (about ), separated by the valley of the Schmale Sinn, are also part of this natural region.

South of Heidelstein and Hoher Hölle the narrow head of the Brend valley near Bischofsheim forms the boundary with another mountain group of the High Rhön, the Kreuzberg Group, which contains the Arnsberg and the Kreuzberg. In between these two mountains lies the source of the Sinn. This river, which forms a wide and deep valley head flanked by the Dammersfeld ridge, flows to the southwest.

On the other side of the Sinn valley, and southwest of the Kreuzberg Group, are the Black Mountains, which include the Schwarzenberg (Feuerberg) and Totnansberg. They are separated from the Kreuzberg Group by the narrow valley of the Premich's upper reaches, the Kellersbach.

Clearly different from the aforementioned ridges is the eastern slope of the Long Rhön, which forms the transition zone from the High Rhön to the muschelkalk region of the Mellrichstadt Gäu (Mellrichstädter Gäu), the eastern part of the Werra Gäu Plateaux. This landscape bears a clear resemblance to the Kuppen Rhön.

Kuppen Rhön 

The  of the "Kuppen Rhön in its narrow sense", to which the Anterior Rhön also belongs, is the wide outer fringe of markedly different relief, that circles around the High Rhön from the northeast (in Thuringia) through the northwest (in Hesse) to the southwest (with small parts in Bavaria). The domes or kuppen are the stumps of heavily weathered former volcanoes or volcanic pipes. Between pointed cones and broad domes lie many small plateaux, especially common in the Anterior Rhön.

Over a foundation of Middle Bunter sandstone lie stratigraphic sequences of Upper Bunter (Röt), muschelkalk and keuper, the last two rocks only surviving where they have been protected by an overlying sheet of basalt. Woods cover less than a third of the area and are largely restricted to the summit regions. Five natural regions may be distinguished:

 Anterior Rhön
 Auersberg Kuppenrhön
 Soisberg Kuppenrhön with the Hessian Skittles
 Milseburg Kuppenrhön
 Brückenau Kuppenrhön

There is hardly any keuper escarpment there at all. The kuppen and plateaux rest directly on a bedrock of muschelkalk. This natural region runs northeast from the wide, pyramidal Pleß, far into the Bunter sandstone of the Stadlengsfeld Hills that descend to the River Werra. In the west the Middle Felda Valley forms a natural boundary between Kaltensundheim in the south and below Dermbach in the north.

West of the Felda valley is the Auersberg Kuppenrhön (Auersberger Kuppenrhön), which lies mainly in Thuringia, but extends into Hesse in the southwest. This natural region runs from the town of Auersberg in the south, which gives the region its name, to the boundary with the Long Rhön at the Ellenbogen, . The western boundary is the Middle Ulster Valley between Hilders in the south and below Buttlar in the north.

West of the Ulster valley is the Soisberg Kuppenrhön (Soisberger Kuppenrhön), which lies mainly in Hesse, with elements in the southeast also extending into Thuringia. It reaches even greater elevations in the extreme southeast, where the Habelberg west of Tann stands opposite to and north of the Auersberg. North and south of the skittles most of the kuppen in this natural region are also arranged in a row along the watershed between the Werra and the Fulda and between the Ulster and the Haune respectively. To the west they do not quite reach the Haune at the Haune Plateaux; to the south the Nüst valley below Obernüst forms a natural boundary.

Again the keuper escarpment is missing and even the muschelkalk only appears in islands around individual domes. The majority of the basalt and phonolite cones sit directly on the sandstones of the Middle Bunter. Cutting deeply into the sandstone, the rivers of the Haune and the Fulda flow westwards. The phonolitic cone of the Milseburg is the only mountain in the Kuppen Rhön that exceeds the 800-metre-mark. Even the height of the Großer Nallenberg south of the Fulda, is not reached in other parts of the region. To the southwest the area is bounded by the rocky sandstone of the Hoher Kammer, as it descends from the heights of the Dammersfeld ridge (up to ).

Separated from the Kammer by the upper reaches of the Döllbach, the Döllau, the Große Haube on the Rhine-Weser watershed opens the Brückenau Kuppenrhön, whose western half is in Hesse and whose eastern half is in Bavaria. The valleys of the Schmaler and Breiter Sinn running southwestwards, divide the natural region, which is clearly more heterogenous than the other ranges of the Kuppen Rhön, into three segments. In the west, the rugged plateaux of dolerite and basalt transition into the Landrücken, whilst the northeast of the Kleiner Auersberg (c. ) leads up to the Dammersfeld ridge. Between the more rugged plateaux and ridges there are gently domed basalt intrusions that rise up, especially in the southeast, left of the Sinn near Bad Brückenau. The Dreistelzberg in the extreme south reaches .

Peaks

The most well-known peaks in the Rhön Mountains include:
Wasserkuppe , Hessian Rhön, highest peak in the High Rhön and in Hesse.
Dammersfeldkuppe , Bavarian-Hessian border, High Rhön.
Kreuzberg , Bavarian Rhön, High Rhön.
Heidelstein , Bavarian-Hessian border, High Rhön.
Himmeldunkberg , Bavarian-Hessian border, High Rhön.
Milseburg , Hessian Rhön, highest peak in the Kuppen Rhön.
Feuerberg , Bavarian Rhön.
Ellenbogen , Thuringian Rhön.
Gebaberg , Hohe Geba, Thuringian Rhön, highest peak in the Anterior Rhön.

Rivers 
The following rivers rise in the Rhön Mountains or flow by or through them (length given in brackets):

 The Franconian Saale (Fränkische Saale)  – rises in Grabfeld, passes the southeast Rhön, flows southwest and into the River Main and therefore belongs to the catchment area of the River Rhine. The valley of the Franconian Saale in the area around Bad Neustadt forms part of the southeast border of the Rhön with the Grabfeld.
 Streu  – rises in the Rhön on the southern slopes of the Ellenbogen and flows southwards into the Franconian Saale.
 The Brend  – rises at Oberweißenbrunn in the Rhön, flows southeast into the Franconian Saale
 The Premich  – rises from numerous springs between the Kreuzberg and the Black Hills, and heads southeast to the Franconian Saale
 The Thulba  – rises on the Platzer Kuppe in the Rhön and flows southwards into the Franconian Saale
 The Schondra  – rises in the Rhön and heads south into the Franconian Saale
 The Sinn  – rises in the Rhön near Wildflecken and flows southwards into the Franconian Saale
 The Fulda  – rises in the Rhön on the Wasserkuppe and is the left headstream of the Weser. The valley of the Fulda in the area around the town of Fulda separates the Rhön from the Vogelsberg Mountains to the west.
 The Haune  – rises in the Rhön and flows north into the Fulda
 The Lütter  – rises below the Wasserkuppe and flows westwards into the Fulda
 The Döllau  – rises in the Rhön, and flows via the Fliede to the Fulda
 The Werra  – rises on the boundary between the Thuringian Forest and Thuringian Highlands, runs past the Rhön to the northeast and flows northwards. It is the right headstream of the Weser. The valley of the Werra between Bad Salzungen and Wasungen separates the Rhön from the Thuringian Forest to the east.
 The Herpf  – rises in the Rhön and flows east into the Werra.
 The Ulster  – rises in the Rhön and flows north into the Werra.
 The Felda  – rises in the Rhön and flows north into the Werra.

History

The name Rhön is believed to be of Celtic origin. A regional Celtic presence is well established, with an important Celtic town at Milseburg. Furthermore, there are circular embankments that could be both of Celtic and of Germanic origin in the Kuppenrhön on the Stallberg and the Kleinberg mountains. Many names of places, mountains and meadows in the Rhön likely have their origins in Celtic root words.

Up to the 10th century parts of the Rhön belonged to Altgau Buchonia. This term was coined by the Romans in Late Antiquity and described an ancient beech forest in the Rhön and the neighbouring low mountain ranges of the Spessart and Vogelsberg. Expansive stands of beech still exist today in the area.

Due to the far reaching view from the Rhön mountains, they became sites for hilltop castles in the Middle Ages. One example is Hauneck Castle (Burg Hauneck) on the Stoppelsberg, the ruins of which can still be seen. It served to oversee and protect traffic on the ancient road, the Antsanvia, as well as protecting the villages in the Haune valley.

In the Middle Ages the Würzburg Defences (landwehr) were erected on the Hochrhön for the protection of its farmers.

The Rhön was also home to the Christian Community known as the Bruderhof from 1926 to 1937 when it was dissolved by Nazi persecution.

Biosphere Reserve

In 1991 UNESCO declared parts of the Rhön a Biosphere Reserve on account of its unique high-altitude ecosystem.

Flora and fauna
As a result of its geography and geology the Rhön is an area with higher-than-average number of different habitats and species. But man, too, has generated valuable secondary habitats by creating a rich cultural landscape.

Plant life

Compared with other low mountain regions, the Rhön is particularly rich in plant varieties. Its natural vegetation would probably be dominated by beech woods with scattered groups of other trees, but today beech trees are very much in decline. A few of these ancient woods were identified as core elements of the Rhön biosphere reserve. The higher beech woods are a habitat for rare, sometimes isolated, species of plant such as the Alpine blue-sow-thistle, giant bellflower and annual honesty. The vegetation of the lower-lying beech woods has a mix of mountain and other varieties. In addition to common wildflowers like the martagon lily, lily of the valley, wild chervil and wild garlic, various orchids also flourish here including Cephalanthera orchids, the yellow coralroot, bird's-nest orchid, lady's slipper and lady orchid.

Only small areas of the Rhön landscape are essentially open: the raised bogs (Hochmoore), the rock outcrops and the stone runs. These habitats are home to highly specialised species. The raised bogs of the Long Rhön - the Red Moor (Rotes Moor) and the Black Moor (Schwarzes Moor) are floristically important links between the northern and Alpine raised bogs. Here, for example, can be found sundews, crowberry and cottongrass. Growing amongst the rocks of the volcanic mountains are rare species such as Cheddar pink, sweet william catchfly, oblong woodsia and fir clubmoss.

There are no naturally occurring coniferous forests in the Rhön, but notable species of wild flower such as the lady's slipper orchid, creeping lady's tresses and burning-bush are found in the forests of mixed pine.

The cultural landscape formed by mankind over the centuries also has a great variety of habitats and plants however, today, the extensive grassland areas are amongst the most threatened and heavily cultivated habitats. It is on the semi-arid grasslands and juniper heaths that the silver thistle, symbol of the Rhön region, grows, alongside gentians, pasque flowers and wood anemones, as well as orchids like the early purple, fragrant and fly orchids. Rarer flowers include the various bee orchids and the military, lady, burnt, green-winged, man, pyramidal, frog and lizard orchids. Along the southern fringes of the Rhön, on the so-called slopes of steppe heathland (Steppenheidenhängen) grow warmth-loving plants such as white rock-rose, erect clematis and honewort.

Amongst the most valuable habitats in the Rhön are the mountain meadows and fields of mat grass (Nardetum strictae) on the higher slopes. Characteristic plants here include the monkshood, northern wolfsbane, common moonwort, martagon lily, greater butterfly orchid, perennial cornflower and wig knapweed.

Bog-bean, grass of Parnassus' western marsh orchid and lousewort are found in the wet meadows and low marshes; and the extremely rare large brown clover, hairy stonecrop and Pyrenean scurvygrass in the springwater marshes of the Hohe Rhön.

Wildlife

The wildlife in the Rhön mountains is similar to that of other low mountain ranges, but there are also some unusual species. In addition to the more common mammals such as roe deer, fox, badger, hare and wild boar, there are also smaller mammals such as the dormouse, common water shrew and Miller's water shrew. One unusual regional species is the alpine shrew. Birds occurring here include the black grouse, the capercaillie, the black stork, the eagle owl, the corncrake, the red-backed shrike and the wryneck. There are also two species endemic to the Rhön: the rove beetle and a local snail, the Rhönquellschnecke (Bythinella compressa).

Rhön umbrella brand

The Dachmarke Rhön project (Rhön umbrella brand project) is run by the Rhön working group and its aim is to promote a common identity for the Rhön region and to present a unified view of the area to the outside world and to harmonise the marketing measures of the three participating federal states.

Tourism

These mountains are a popular tourist destination. More recently, farm holidays have been flourishing in the region.

Attractions

 Klaushof Wildlife Park in Bad Kissingen.
 Botenlauben Castle Ruins in Bad Kissingen.
 Black Moor
 Kloster Kreuzberg - the monastery on the Kreuzberg.
 Wasserkuppe - the highest mountain.
 Observation Post Alpha - a former U.S. OP during the Cold War, now a memorial.

Villages and towns in the Rhön

 Bad Brückenau
 Bischofsheim an der Rhön
 Burkardroth
 Dipperz
 Dermbach
 Ebersburg
 Ehrenberg
 Eiterfeld
 Friedewald
 Fladungen
 Geisa
 Gersfeld (Rhön)
 Hausen
 Helmershausen
 Hilders
 Hofbieber
 Hünfeld
 Kaltennordheim
 Nordheim vor der Rhön
 Oberleichtersbach
 Oechsen
 Ostheim vor der Rhön
 Poppenhausen
 Riedenberg
 Tann
 Wildflecken

Towns in the vicinity of the Rhön
Towns and larger villages close to the Rhön are:

 Bad Hersfeld
 Bad Kissingen
 Bad Bocklet
 Bad Neustadt
 Bad Salzungen
 Eichenzell
 Fulda
 Künzell
 Hammelburg
 Hünfeld
 Meiningen
 Mellrichstadt
 Vacha
 Wasungen

Walks and hiking trails

There are well-marked walks and hiking trails in the Rhön which are looked after by the Rhön Club. The Rhön-Höhen-Weg ("Rhön Heights Walk" or RHW) is marked with a horizontal, red teardrop.

Other hiking trails are:
 The Ortesweg ("Village Way") signposted with a 2/3-full red triangle and running from Kleinheiligkreuz over the Milseburg to Bad Neustadt 
 The Burgen- und Schlösserweg ("Castle Way") signed with a red triangle from Schlitz via Tann to Wasungen 
 The Milseburgweg ("Milseburg Way") marked with red triangles from Fulda via the Milseburg to Meiningen 
 The Wasserkuppenweg ("Wasserkuppen Way"), marked with red triangles, from Giesel over the Wasserkuppe towards Fladungen 
 The Heidelsteinweg ("Heidelstein Way"), from Neuhof via Gersfeld to Ostheim vor der Rhön 
 The Klosterweg ("Monastery Way") marked with red triangles from Schlüchtern via Wildflecken to Mellrichstadt 
 The Kreuzbergweg ("Kreuzberg Way") marked with red triangles from Schwarzenfels over the Kreuzberg to Bad Königshofen 
 The Jakobusweg ("Jacob's Way") from Fulda to Schweinfurt signed with blue shells 
 The Jakobusweg from Bremen in Thuringia to Herbstein signed with blue shells 
 The Abtsweg ("Abbot's Way") from Fulda to Hammelburg signed with a red teardrop 
 The Rhön-Paulus-Weg ("Rhön Paul Way") from Weilar via Tann to Dermbach marked with a 2/3-full green triangle 
 The Geological Walk on the Wasserkuppe
 The Auersberg Nature Walk near Hilders
 The Milseburg Prehistoric Walk
 10 circular walks in Thalau; a total of 

In addition the following pass through the Rhön:
 The Main-Werra Weg ("Main-Werra Way") from Gemünden over the Kreuzberg and Wasserkuppe to Vacha, signed with a red arrowhead 
 The Rhön-Rennsteig-Weg ("Rhön-Rennsteig Way") from the Wasserkuppe over the Geba to Oberhof , marked with a blue "RR" on a white background
 European long-distance trail No. 3 via Fulda to Mellrichstadt, signed with a blue cross
 European long-distance trail No. 6 via Hünfeld, Gersfeld to Bad Königshofen, signed with a white cross on a blue background

See also

 Bavarian Rhön Nature Park
 Rhön Biosphere Reserve

References

Sources
 Hanswilhelm Haefs: Ortsnamen und Ortsgeschichten aus der Rhön und dem Fuldaer Land. Rhön-Verlag. Hünfeld 2001, 
 Marco Klüber: Orchideen in der Rhön und ihre Lebensräume. schützen – pflegen – bewahren. Landkreis Fulda, Sachgebiet Biosphärenreservat Rhön (Hrsg.), 2007.

External links
Rhön tourism portal
Rhön Biosphere Reserve website
360° virtual tour through the Hessian Rhön (in German)
Orchids of the Rhön, with much information the local flora (in German)

 
Mountain ranges of Bavaria
Volcanoes of Germany
Extinct volcanoes
Mountain ranges of Hesse
Mountain ranges of Thuringia
Biosphere reserves of Germany
!